Max Seiling (1852–1928) was a German engineer and writer.

Life and career 
Born in Mittenwald, Max Seiling emigrated, after having studied in München, to the Grand Duchy of Finland where he became a professor at a polytechnic school. Because of this activity, he was promoted to Privy Councillor of the Russian crown.

Seiling was involved in the anthroposophist movement and was initially an enthusiastic supporter, but eventually became one of their most ardent opponents. In his later years, he became a devout Roman Catholic. His wife was Helene Seiling, who wrote a cookbook for vegetarians.

Seiling died in Speyer.

Works
 Mainlander: Ein Neuer Messias (München, 1888)
 Meine Erfahrungen auf dem Gebiet des Spiritismus 1898
 Goethe und der Materialismus (Leipzig, 1904)
 Theosophie und Christentum (Berlin, 1910)
 Richard Wagner (Leipzig, 1911)
 Ernst Haeckel und der „Spiritismus“, Ein Protest (1914)
 Goethe als Okkultist (Leipzig, 1919)

References

1852 births
1928 deaths
19th-century German engineers
19th-century German male writers
Converts to Roman Catholicism from Anthroposophy
German Roman Catholics